Silver is the debut studio album by the alternative rock band The Wrens, released June 11, 1994.

Critical reception
Trouser Press wrote: "Frenetic guitar stylings in classic post-punk slapdash mode underpin most of the tracks; bassist Kevin Whelan, guitarists Greg Whelan and Charles Bissell and drummer Jerry MacDonnell take turns singing lead; the predominantly strained, nasal vocals render a lot of the lyrics indiscernible but lend a heartfelt charm." The Morning Call wrote that the album shows "a musical depth unusual for a debut that has echoes of The Jam, XTC, The Cure and the Pixies."

Track listing

References 

1994 debut albums
The Wrens albums